Schizolaena parvipetala is a plant in the family Sarcolaenaceae. It is endemic to Madagascar. The specific epithet  is from the Latin meaning "small flowers".

Description
Its twigs are glabrous, occasionally pubescent with small lenticels. The leaves are elliptic to ovate in shape. The inflorescences bear two to four flowers, each with three sepals and five white petals. Fruits are unknown.

Distribution and habitat
Schizolaena parvipetala is known only from the southeastern coastal region of Anosy. Its habitat is lowland humid forest from sea-level to about  altitude.

Threats
Schizolaena parvipetala is currently known only from two localities. In one, the Bemangidy-Ivohibe forest, the species is temporarily protected as part of Tsitongambarika New Protected Area, but permanent protection has yet to be granted. The forest is vulnerable to human activity via conversion and degradation.

References

parvipetala
Endemic flora of Madagascar
Plants described in 2014